The following is a list of countries by iron ore exports. Data is for 2012 & 2016, in millions of United States dollars, as reported by The Observatory of Economic Complexity. Currently the top twenty countries (as of 2016) are listed.

* indicates "Natural resources of COUNTRY or TERRITORY" links.

See also
 List of iron mines
 List of countries by iron ore production

References
atlas.media.mit.edu - Observatory of Economic complexity - Countries that export Iron Ore (2012)
atlas.media.mit.edu - Observatory of Economic complexity - Countries that export Iron Ore (2016)

Iron-ore
Iron ore exports

Iron-ore